Peter Urminský (born 24 May 1999) is a Slovak professional footballer who plays for Scottish club St Mirren, as a goalkeeper.

Career
Urminský began his career at Spartak Trnava, moving on loan to Trenčín in February 2019. In January 2020 he signed for Scottish club St Mirren. St Mirren's goalkeeper Vaclav Hladky offered to mentor Urminský.
 
In September 2020 he was ruled out of first-team action after training with players who had tested positive for coronavirus, despite testing negative himself. In February 2021 he joined Ayr United on an emergency 7-day loan. The loan was later extended until the end of the season.

In May 2021 he agreed a new one-year contract with St Mirren. In August 2021 he was praised for his performances for St Mirren B.

He moved on loan to Stenhousemuir in January 2022.

He made his debut for St Mirren in July 2022 during the Scottish League Cup group stage, following an injury to first choice keeper Trevor Carson.

References

1999 births
Living people
Slovak footballers
Association football goalkeepers
Scottish Professional Football League players
FC Spartak Trnava players
AS Trenčín players
St Mirren F.C. players
Ayr United F.C. players
Stenhousemuir F.C. players
Slovak expatriate footballers
Slovak expatriate sportspeople in Scotland
Expatriate footballers in Scotland